is a retired Japanese athlete specialising in the pole vault. She competed at the 2004 Summer Olympics and three consecutive World Championships each time failing to qualify for the final. She was the gold medalist at the 2000 Asian Athletics Championships.

She has personal bests of 4.35 metres outdoors and 4.20 metres indoors.

Personal bests

Competition record

National titles
Japanese Championships
Pole vault: 2001, 2002, 2004, 2005, 2007, 2009

References

External links

Takayo Kondo at JAAF 
Takayo Kondo at JOC 
Takayo Kondo at TBS  (archived)

1975 births
Living people
People from Ōtsu, Shiga
Sportspeople from Shiga Prefecture
Japanese female pole vaulters
Olympic female pole vaulters
Olympic athletes of Japan
Athletes (track and field) at the 2004 Summer Olympics
Asian Games competitors for Japan
Athletes (track and field) at the 1998 Asian Games
Athletes (track and field) at the 2002 Asian Games
World Athletics Championships athletes for Japan
Japan Championships in Athletics winners
20th-century Japanese women
21st-century Japanese women